Kostovo is a rural locality (a selo) and the administrative center of Stepnyanskoye Rural Settlement, Olkhovatsky District, Voronezh Oblast, Russia. The population was 695 as of 2010. There are 8 streets.

Geography 
Kostovo is located 21 km southwest of Olkhovatka (the district's administrative centre) by road. Konnoye is the nearest rural locality.

References 

Rural localities in Olkhovatsky District